Yuleba is a rural town and locality in the Maranoa Region, in the south-west of Queensland, Australia.

Geography 

Indigenous People 
Mandandanji (also known as Mandandanyi, Mandandanjdji, Kogai) is an Australian Aboriginal language spoken by the Mandandanji people. The Mandandanji language region includes the landscape within the local government boundaries of the Maranoa Regional Council, particularly Roma, Yuleba and Surat, then east towards Chinchilla and south-west towards Mitchell and St George.

The town is said to be named after an Aboriginal word meaning "the place of water lilies".

History 
When it was named in 1865, it was a settlement on Yuleba Creek. However, in October 1879 the town moved to the railway crossing on Yuleba Creek and was officially called Baltinglass. However, this was changed to Yuleba in 1901. However, due to an error in assembling a sign for the railway station, the station and the town were known as the misspelt Yeulba. In 1938, the name was changed to the original intended name of Yuleba.

Baltinglass Provisional School opened on 10 November 1880. On 1 April 1884 it was renamed Yeulba State School. In 1939 the spelling of the name was changed to Yuleba State School.

As a railhead for the region to the west, the town was an important centre until the railway was extended again to Roma in 1910.

The last Cobb and Co stagecoach run, on 16 August 1924, ran between Yuleba and Surat.

In 1954 the former Bendemere Shire Council (now a constituent part of the Maranoa Region) erected a memorial hall in Yuleba with an honor board commemorating those from the shire who had served in World War II. It was officially opened on 15 May 1954 by Alfred Dohring, the Member of the Queensland Legislative Assembly for Roma.

On 9 October 1964 Queensland Premier Frank Nicklin unveiled a large mural at the Yuleba Memorial Hall. The mural depicts many scenes of war and was painted by local artist and jackaroo Robert (Fred) Doyle.

The Yuleba Public Library had a major refurbishment in 2015 undertaken by the Maranoa Regional Council.

Education 
Yuleba State School is a government primary (Prep-6) school for boys and girls at Perry Street. In 2018, the school had an enrolment of 23 students with 2 teachers and 5 non-teaching staff (2 full-time equivalent).

There is no secondary school in Yuleba. The closest Secondary School is Wallumbilla State School but it only offers high school education up to Year 10. The nearest state high schools offering Years 11 and 12 of secondary school are Roma State College in Roma ( west) and Miles State High School in Miles ( east).

Economy 
Today, Yuleba is the site of a modern mining and processing facility working a high grade silica deposit.

Transportation 
Yuleba is serviced by the Western Railway Line to Charleville.

Yuleba Railway Station is a timetabled stop for Queensland Rail Travel's twice - weekly Westlander services between Roma Street Railway Station and Charleville Railway Station.

 the Westbound service (3S86) to Charleville stops at Yuleba on Wednesdays and Fridays (passengers travelling to Wallumbilla are requested to alight from the service here for onward transport to Wallumbilla.
 the Eastbound service (3987) to Roma Street stops at Yuleba on Thursdays and Saturdays

Yuleba is ideally situated on the Warrego Highway as it is on the major Brisbane - Darwin route.

The Yuleba Hotel - Motel is the designated stop for Greyhound Australia's daily Intercity services:

 Gx493 (Brisbane - Mount Isa)
 Gx494 (Mount Isa - Brisbane)
 Gx495 (Brisbane - Charleville)
 Gx496 (Charleville - Brisbane)

Amenities 
The Maranoa Regional Council operates a public library in Yuleba at Stephenson Street with a high-speed ISDN Internet Connection (provided through the National Broadband Network) to Brisbane.

References

External links

 
 

Towns in Queensland
Maranoa Region
Populated places established in 1878
Localities in Queensland